(Upper) Bucket Lake is a lake in Kreis Rendsburg-Eckernförde, Schleswig-Holstein, Germany. At an elevation of 14 m, its surface area is 1.5 ha. The lake belongs to Eckernförde.

The genesis of the bucket lake in Eckernförde is unique: a polythene bucket (hence the name) was used as a plug in a pipe in 1990. Since then, the lake has become a habitat with a huge diversity of plants and animals. This was also seen as a successful example of cheap land restoration in Japan, in South Korea and in the United States.

A short documentary about the lake was shown at the Green Screen film festival, at the Matsalu Nature Film Festival in Estonia and is shown at the Innsbruck Nature Film Festival (Austria) in 2016. The documentary from German filmmaker Sven Bohde is available in German, English and Japanese.

External links 
 Documentary film in German, English and Japanese

References

Lakes of Schleswig-Holstein
Rendsburg-Eckernförde
Artificial lakes of Germany
Conservation projects